A gubernatorial election was held on 13 March 2022 to elect the next governor of , a prefecture of Japan located in the Chūbu region of Honshu island..

Candidates 

Masanori Tanimoto, 76, incumbent since 1994, is not seeking re election. He support Hiroshi Hase.

Hiroshi Hase, 60, former high school teacher of Japanese, former Lower House member of the LDP, supported by Ishin.
Yukiyoshi Yamano, a 59-year-old former mayor (LDP) of the Ishikawa prefectural capital of Kanazawa.
Shuji Yamada, a 67-year-old former Upper House member of the LDP. He was backed by the Ishikawa prefectural branches of the CDP and the SDP, as well as the RENGO Ishikawa.
Hiroko Iimori, 62, endorsed by JCP.
Haruo Okano, 71, former company employee, fought in the election by stressing his commitment to solve environmental problems.

LDP’s prefectural chapter ended up backing both Hase and Yamada, and letting its members to vote as they like.
Komeito, the LDP’s junior coalition partner, also allowed its members to decide on their own how to vote.

Results

References 

2022 elections in Japan
Ishikawa gubernational elections
March 2022 events in Japan